Sophie Marie Opel, née Scheller (February 13, 1840 - October 30, 1913), was a German early industrial entrepreneur. With her sisters Dorothée and Elise Scheller she invested in the Adam Opel works in Rüsselsheim and she managed the transformation from sewing machine and bicycle production to an automobile factory. After the death of her spouse and company owner Adam Opel in 1895 she became biggest shareholder and with two of her sons she developed the company to a leading European car company. In 1895 the firm already had over 1000 employees.

Notes

References
 Gerta Walsh: Sophie Opel – Unternehmerin im 19. Jahrhundert. In: Hessische Heimat. Heft 2/1992, S. 68–70.

1840 births
1913 deaths
German automotive pioneers
German industrialists
19th-century German businesspeople
Sophie